Fibroblast growth factor 10 is a protein that in humans is encoded by the FGF10 gene.

Function 

The protein encoded by this gene is a member of the fibroblast growth factor (FGF) family. FGF family members possess broad mitogenic and cell survival activities, and are involved in a variety of biological processes, including embryonic development, cell growth, morphogenesis, tissue repair, tumor growth and invasion. Fibroblast growth factor 10 is a paracrine signaling molecule seen first in the limb bud and organogenesis development. FGF10 starts the developing of limbs and its involved in the branching of morphogenesis in multiple organs such as the lungs, skin, ear and salivary glands. During the limb development Tbx4/Tbx5 stimulate the production of FGF10 in the lateral plate mesoderm where it will create an epithelial-mesenchymal FGF signal with FGF8. This positive feedback loop will increase the amount of mesenchyme resulting in a bulge. Afterwards, FGF10 will induce the formation of apical ectodermal ridge (AER) where the foot and hands will be formed. Lung development uses the same epithelial-mesenchymal signaling from FGF10 in the foregut mesenchyme with FGFR2 in the foregut epithelium. FGF10 signaling is required for epithelial branching. Therefore, all branching morphogen organs such as the lungs, skin, ear and salivary glands required the constant expression of FGF10.  This protein exhibits mitogenic activity for keratinizing epidermal cells, but essentially no activity for fibroblasts, which is similar to the biological activity of FGF7.

Clinical significance 

Nonsense mutations may also occur with the absence of FGF10 such as LADD and ALSG syndrome. Nevertheless, complications may arise from FGF10 signaling such as pancreatic and breast cancer. Although this gene is also implicated to be a primary factor in the process of wound healing.

Animal studies 

FGF10 knockout mice die right after birth. The mice showed no developing organs such as lungs, salivary glands, kidney or definitive limbs once autopsied. Studies of the mouse homolog suggested that this gene is required for embryonic epidermal morphogenesis including brain development, lung morphogenesis, and initiation of limb bud formation.

See also 

 Turtle shell

References

Further reading

External links 
  OMIM entry on aplasia of lacrimal and salivary glands